Hassan Martin (born November 12, 1995) is an American professional basketball player for Crvena zvezda of the Adriatic League and the EuroLeague.

College career
Martin averaged 6.3 points per game as a freshman at Rhode Island and increased his scoring rate to 11.4 points per game as a sophomore. As a junior, Martin posted 12.0 points per game. As a senior, Martin averaged 13.6 points, 6.8 rebounds and 2.4 blocks per game. He was a big part of the first Rams team to reach the NCAA Tournament since 1999. He was twice named Atlantic 10 Defensive Player of the Year. He was named to the All-Atlantic 10 Second Team as a senior despite missing five games with an injury and being limited for several more.

Professional career
After going undrafted in 2017, he played for the Orlando Magic in the Summer League. He signed with the Ryukyu Golden Kings of the Japanese league, where he became one of the leading scorers and drew praise for his athleticism.

In 2018, Martin signed a deal with Medi Bayreuth of the German BBL.

On June 27, 2019, he has signed a contract with Budućnost VOLI of the ABA League.

On June 30, 2020, Martin signed a two-year deal with Greek powerhouse Olympiacos of the EuroLeague.

On July 9, 2022, Martin signed a two-year contract with Serbian club Crvena zvezda of the EuroLeague.

Career achievements and awards 
 Greek League champion: 1  (with Olympiacos: 2021–22)
 Greek Cup winner: 1  (with Olympiacos: 2021–22)
 Montenegrin Cup winner: 1  (with Budućnost VOLI: 2019–20)

Individual
Atlantic 10 Defensive Player of the Year – 2016, 2017
All-Atlantic 10 Second Team – 2015, 2017
Atlantic 10 All-Defensive Team – 2015, 2016, 2017

References

External links
Euroleague.net Profile
Proballers Profile
Rhode Island Rams bio 

1995 births
Living people
ABA League players
American expatriate basketball people in Germany
American expatriate basketball people in Greece
American expatriate basketball people in Japan
American expatriate basketball people in Montenegro
American expatriate basketball people in Serbia
American men's basketball players
Basketball players from New York City
Centers (basketball)
KK Budućnost players
KK Crvena zvezda players
Olympiacos B.C. players
Medi Bayreuth players
Power forwards (basketball)
Rhode Island Rams men's basketball players
Ryukyu Golden Kings players
Sportspeople from Staten Island